The following is a list of notable deaths in December 1990.

Entries for each day are listed alphabetically by surname. A typical entry lists information in the following sequence:
 Name, age, country of citizenship at birth, subsequent country of citizenship (if applicable), reason for notability, cause of death (if known), and reference.

December 1990

1
Sergio Corbucci, 63, Italian film director and screenwriter, heart attack.
Simone Melchior Cousteau, 71, French aquanaut, cancer.
Pierre Dux, 82, French actor.
Robert Gordon, 77, American director and actor.
Erich Hüttenhain, 85, German academic mathematician and cryptographer.
Anton Kochinyan, 77, Soviet Armenian politician.
Carla Lehmann, 73, Canadian actress.
Vito Miceli, 74, Italian politician and general.
David A. Morse, 83, American labor bureaucrat.
Vijaya Lakshmi Pandit, 90, Indian diplomat and politician.
Octavio Beras Rojas, 84, Dominican Roman Catholic cardinal.

2
Richard Benner, 46-47, American film director and screenwriter, AIDS.
John Britton, 71, American baseball player.
Marc Cerboni, 35, French Olympic fencer (1984).
Aaron Copland, 90, American composer and conductor, Alzheimer's disease.
Robert Cummings, 80, American actor, kidney failure and complications from pneumonia.
Paul Hoffmann, 88, German actor.
Edward Oldfield, 70, Australian politician.
Paddy Smith, 96, American baseball player.
Clint Thomas, 94, American baseball player.
Georg Wildhagen, 70, German filmmaker.

3
Tim Dlugos, 40, American poet, AIDS.
Gerry Doyle, 79, Irish footballer.
Rolf Hansen, 85, German film director.
Heino Mandri, 68, Estonian film and stage actor.
Ray Wagner, 88, American gridiron football player.

4
Edward Binns, 74, American actor (12 Angry Men, North by Northwest, Judgment at Nuremberg), heart attack.
Jack J. Catton, 70, American Air Force general.
Charles B. MacDonald, 68, American army historian, cancer.
Nelson Peterson, 77, American football player.
Naoto Tajima, 78, Japanese athlete and Olympic  champion.
Kimio Yada, 77, Japanese Olympic track and field athlete (1936).

5
Peter Blum, 65, South African poet.
Robert Chesley, 47, American playwright, AIDS.
Kai Curry-Lindahl, 73, Swedish zoologist.
Lucy Dawidowicz, 75, American historian.
Narayan Gopal, 51, Nepali singer, diabetes.
Josef Jedlička, 63, Czechoslovak writer.
Ott-Heinrich Keller, 84, German mathematician.
Alfonso A. Ossorio, 74, Filipino-American artist.
Jack Pleis, 73, American jazz musician.
Howard Allen Schneiderman, 63, American entomologist.
Steve Shaw, 25, American actor, traffic collision.

6
Ed Bell, 69, American football player.
Natan Brand, 46, Israeli classical pianist, lymphoma.
Bob Hamilton, 74, American golfer.
Bill Hardman, 57, American trumpeter, intracerebral hemorrhage.
George Healis, 84, American Olympic rower (1928).
Otto Hitzfeld, 92, German general.
F. Jay Nimtz, 75, American politician, member of the U.S. House of Representatives (1957–1959).
Remi Prudhomme, 48, American football player.
Polingaysi Qöyawayma, 98, American Hopi educator.
Tunku Abdul Rahman, 87, Malaysian politician, prime minister (1957–1970). .
Pavlos Sidiropoulos, 42, Greek rock singer, songwriter and guitarist, heroin overdose.

7
Joan Bennett, 80, American actress, heart failure. .
Horst Bienek, 60, German novelist, AIDS.
Norman Bower, 83, British politician.
Dee Clark, 52, American soul singer, heart attack.
Jean Duceppe, 67, Stage and television actor from Montreal, Quebec.
Reinaldo Arenas Fuentes, 47, Cuban novelist, playwright and poet, suicide.
Pierre Henri Landry, 92, Russian-French tennis player.
Luis Frangella, 46, Argentine-American artist, AIDS.
Jean Paul Lemieux, 86, Canadian painter.
Ralph McKinzie, 96, American sports coach.
Peter Mieg, 84, Swiss composer.
Oscar Millard, 82, English screenwriter.
Rinaldo Ossola, 77, Italian politician.
David Richmond, 49, American civil rights activist, lung cancer.
Vilmos Énekes, 75, Hungarian boxer.

8
John Alexander, 67, American opera singer, heart attack.
Deane C. Davis, 90, American politician, governor of Vermont (1969–1973).
Ed Edmondson, 71, American politician, member of the U.S. House of Representatives (1953–1973).
Tadeusz Kantor, 75, Polish painter and theatre director.
Boris Kochno, 86, Russian dancer, librettist and poet, accidental fall.
Lana Marconi, 73, Romanian-French actress.
Forrest S. Petersen, 68, American pilot, brain cancer.
Martin Ritt, 76, American film director (Hud, Norma Rae, Sounder), heart disease.
William Atcheson Stewart, 75, Canadian politician.

9
Ben Duijker, 87, Dutch Olympic cyclist (1928).
Henry Hicks, 75, Canadian politician, traffic collision.
Mike Mazurki, 82, American actor and professional wrestler.
Nirala, 53, Pakistani comedian and actor.

10
Yves Devernay, 53, French organist and composer, heart attack.
Armand Hammer, 92, American industrialist and philanthropist, bone marrow cancer.
Dorothea Kent, 74, American actress, breast cancer.
Marino Morettini, 59, Italian Olympic cyclist (1952).
Doyle Nave, 75, American football player.
Bert Weeks, 73, Canadian politician.

11
Arthur Kornhauser, 94, American industrial psychologist, stroke.
Peter Millman, 84, Canadian astronomer.
Robert Noble, 80, Canadian physicist.
David Turner, 63, British playwright.

12
Giorgio Ghezzi, 60, Italian footballer, heart attack.
Jack Harley, 79, British botanist.
Concha Piquer, 83, Spanish actress and singer, heart attack.
Ian Trethowan, 68, British journalist and broadcaster, ALS.

13
Buddy Justus, 37, American convicted spree killer, execution by electric chair.
Edwin Lester, 95, American theatre director.
Marta Linden, 87, American actress.
Alice Marble, 77, American tennis player and Grand Slam winner, pernicious anemia.
Alfred Dennis Sieminski, 79, American politician, member of the U.S. House of Representatives (1951–1959), heart attack.
Jaroslav Volf, 57, Czechoslovak ice hockey player.
Archie Ware, 72, American baseball player.

14
Friedrich Dürrenmatt, 69, Swiss crime novelist, dramatist and satirist, heart failure.
Nan Wood Graham, 91, American artist, model for American Gothic.
Red Heron, 72, Canadian ice hockey player.
Gunild Keetman, 86, German musicologist.
Zhang Qun, 101, Taiwanese politician, premier (1947–1948).
Francisco Gabilondo Soler, 83, Mexican composer.
Johannes, 11th Prince of Thurn and Taxis, 64, German businessman and noble, complications from heart surgery.
Pietro Tordi, 84, Italian actor.

15
Julio Gutiérrez, 72, Cuban musician.
Mikayil Jabrayilov, 38, Soviet Azerbaijani soldier, killed in battle.
Jean Paige, 95, American silent film actress.
Ed Parker, 59, American martial artist, heart attack.
Frederic Seebohm, Baron Seebohm, 81, British banker, traffic collision.
Tamao Shiwaku, 84, Japanese Olympic runner (1936).
Chen Zhifang, 83-84, Chinese diplomat.

16
Marc Augier, 82, French far-right writer.
Douglas Campbell, 94, American aviator and flying ace during World War I.
Art Koeninger, 84, American football player.
Jackie Mittoo, 42, Jamaican-Canadian musician, cancer.

17
William Cobb, 72-73, American roller coaster designer.
John Grover, 75, English cricket player.
Frank Hutchison, 93, New Zealand cricket player.
Eurialo De Michelis, 86, Italian writer.
Ludwig Lachmann, 84, German economist.
Guy Lafarge, 86, French composer of operettas and popular songs.

18
Bernard Addison, 85, American guitarist.
Arthur Roy Clapham, 86, British botanist.
Charlie Gibson, 91, American baseball player.
Geoffrey Giles, 67, Australian politician.
Tadahiko Hayashi, 72, Japanese photographer, liver cancer.
Orazio Orlando, 57, Italian actor, heart attack.
Anne Revere, 87, American actress, pneumonia.
Connie Russell, 67, American singer and actress (Red Hot Riding Hood).
Greta Stevenson, 79, New Zealand mycologist.
Paul Tortelier, 76, French cellist.
Hazel Walker, 76, American amateur basketball player.

19
Rubem Braga, 77, Brazilian writer.
Edmond Delfour, 83, French footballer.
Norbert Dufourcq, 86, French musicologist.
Basil Henson, 72, English actor.
Michael Oakeshott, 89, English philosopher.
Count Oluf of Rosenborg, 67, Danish noble.
Billy Tidwell, 60, American football player.

20
Edward J. Bonin, 85, American politician, member of the U.S. House of Representatives (1953–1955).
Marc Chirik, 83, Russian-French communist revolutionary.
Valeriu Călinoiu, 62, Romanian footballer.
Andrea Dunbar, 29, English playwright, intracerebral hemorrhage.
John Hewetson, 77, British newspaper editor.
Lauro Mumar, 66, Filipino basketball player.
Mahmudun Nabi, 54, Bangladeshi singer.
Karl Rolvaag, 77, American politician and diplomat, governor of Minnesota (1963–1967).
Gershom Schocken, 78, Israeli politician and journalist, liver cancer.
Elmo Tanner, 86, American singer and whistler.

21
Sigurd Anderson, 86, Norwegian-American politician, governor of South Dakota (1951–1955).
Medard Boss, 87, Swiss psychiatrist.
Yi Geon, 81, Korean prince and Imperial Japanese Army officer during World War II.
Kelly Johnson, 80, American aeronautical engineer.
Magda Julin, 96, Swedish figure skater, Olympic champion (1920).
Ivan Knunyants, 84, Soviet chemist.
Surendra Mohanty, 68, Indian author and politician.
József von Platthy, 90, Hungarian Olympic equestrian (1936).
Fred Washington, 23, American football player, traffic collision.

22
Cecil Effinger, 76, American composer.
Robin Friday, 38, English footballer, heart attack.
Ward Hawkins, 77, American author.
Ken Irvine, 50, Australian rugby player, leukemia.

23
Pierre Chenal, 86, French filmmaker.
Serge Danot, 59, French animator.
József Darányi, 85, Hungarian Olympic shot putter (1928, 1932, 1936).
Pierre Gripari, 65, French writer, complications from surgery.
Richard Irving, 73, American actor, director and producer.
Frank King, 64, Barbadian cricketer.
Foy D. Kohler, 82, American diplomat.
Herbert Salzman, 74, American businessman and Economics consultant.
Wendell Scott, 69, American stock car racing driver, spinal cancer.
Wilmar H. Shiras, 82, American science fiction author.

24
Thorbjørn Egner, 78, Norwegian children's writer, playwright and songwriter, heart attack.
Judith Ledeboer, 89, Dutch-English architect.
Friedrich Luft, 79, German theatre critic.
Rodolfo Orlandini, 85, Argentine footballer.
Irvin Stewart, 91, American communications administrator.
Gwyn Williams, 86, Welsh writer.

25
John Stuart Anderson, 82, British-Australian chemist, cancer.
Vladimir Belousov, 83, Soviet geologist.
Aleksandr Luchinskiy, 90, Soviet general.
Warwick Snedden, 70, New Zealand cricketer.
Nicolaas Tates, 75, Dutch Olympic canoeist (1936).
Dodo Watts, 79, British stage and film actress.

26
Jack Beattie, 83, British-Canadian ice hockey player.
Gene Callahan, 67, American set and production designer and art director, heart attack.
George Elliott Hagan, 74, American politician, member of the U.S. House of Representatives (1961–1973).
Portland Hoffa, 85, American comedian, radio host, actress, and dancer.
Eddie Kimball, 87, American football player.

27
Abulfat Aliyev, 63, Soviet and Azerbaijani opera singer.
Hendrika Gerritsen, 69, Dutch resistance member during World War II.
Concha Michel, 91, Mexican singer-songwriter, political activist, and playwright,.
Helene Stanley, 61, American actress.
Harold Town, 66, Canadian painter.
Chang Ucchin, 73, South Korean artist.

28
Edward Brayshaw, 57, Australian actor, throat cancer.
Ed van der Elsken, 65, Dutch photographer, prostate cancer.
Dario Graffi, 85, Italian mathematical physicist.
Seiji Hisamatsu, 78, Japanese film director.
Gilbert W. Lindsay, 90, American politician.
Kiel Martin, 46, American actor, lung cancer.
Arne Petersen, 77, Danish Olympic cyclist (1936).
Warren Skaaren, 44, American screenwriter and film producer, bone cancer.

29
Giulio Bedeschi, 75, Italian writer and Army officer during World War II.
Goree Carter, 59, American singer, guitarist, drummer, and songwriter.
Mona Dol, 89, French actress.
Aleardo Donati, 86, Italian wrestler.
Sir David Piper, 72, British author and museum curator.
Aulikki Rautawaara, 84, Finnish soprano.
Frederick Wolters, 86, American field hockey player.

30
Fergal Caraher, 20, Northern-Irish Provisional IRA volunteer, shot.
Jill Cruwys, 47, English cricket player.
Oliver Daniel, 79, American musicologist.
Géza Füster, 80, Hungarian-Canadian chess player.
Albert Mertz, 70, Danish painter.
Raghuvir Sahay, 61, Indian writer.

31
Elsie Allen, 91, American Pomo basket weaver.
George Allen, 72, American football coach, ventricular fibrillation.
Ed Gantner, 31, American professional wrestler, suicide by gunshot.
Donald Kingaby, 70, English-American flying ace during World War II.
Vasily Lazarev, 62, Soviet cosmonaut.
Giovanni Michelucci, 99, Italian architect, urban planner and designer.
Moni Singh, 89, Bangladeshi politician.
Ernst von Siemens, 87, German business magnate.

References 

1990-12
 12